Mikawa Station is the name of three train stations in Japan:

 Mikawa Station (Hokkaido) (三川駅)
 Mikawa Station (Ishikawa) (美川駅)
 Mikawa Station (Niigata) (三川駅)